Pilszcz  is a village in the administrative district of Gmina Kietrz, within Głubczyce County, Opole Voivodeship, in south-western Poland, close to the Czech border.

The village has a population of 755 as of 2007.

References

Villages in Głubczyce County
Czech Republic–Poland border crossings